Steven "Steve" Keiner is an American competitive eater. He was the 1999 winner of the annual Nathan's Hot Dog Eating Contest in Coney Island, downing 20¼ hot dogs in 12 minutes. Keiner is from Egg Harbor Township, New Jersey and like many competitive eaters has used nicknames during contests; one of his nicknames, "Ralph," was given to him by newspaper reporter Gersh Kuntzman, because Kuntzman "gave the eaters nicknames that linked them to sporting heroes past" (possibly inspired by the name of baseball hall-of-famer Ralph Kiner, in this particular case). Kuntzman also provided much of the only media coverage of the controversy surrounding Keiner's title, reporting that video appeared to show that Keiner may have begun eating his hot dogs just before the contest's starting gun was fired. Keiner is also sometimes known on the competitive eating circuit as "The Terminator."

References

External links
 A city press release on Steve Keiner

Living people
American competitive eaters
People from Egg Harbor Township, New Jersey
Year of birth missing (living people)